The Journal of Algebra and Its Applications covers both theoretical and applied algebra, with a focus on practical applications. It is published by World Scientific.

According to the Journal Citation Reports, the journal has a 2020 impact factor of 0.736.

Abstracting and indexing 
The journal is abstracted and indexed in:

 Mathematical Reviews
 Zentralblatt MATH
 Science Citation Index Expanded
 Current Contents/Physical Chemical and Earth Sciences
 Journal Citation Reports/Science Edition
 INSPEC

References

Publications established in 2008
Mathematics journals
World Scientific academic journals
English-language journals